K. P. Rajendra Prasad (died February 14, 2020) was an Indian politician who served as Member of the Legislative Assembly. He was elected to the Tamil Nadu legislative assembly as an Anna Dravida Munnetra Kazhagam candidate from Padmanabhapuram constituency in Kanyakumari district in 2001 election.

References 

All India Anna Dravida Munnetra Kazhagam politicians
2020 deaths
Members of the Tamil Nadu Legislative Assembly
Year of birth missing